Birkende is a town with a population of 706 (1 January 2022) located in the Kerteminde municipality, on the island of Funen in central Denmark.

Birkende's local football team is Birkende BK

Notable people 
 Hans Tausen (1494 Birkende – 1561), the leading Lutheran theologian of the Danish Reformation. He served as the Bishop of Ribe. There is a monument to him in the town centre.

References

Index Mundi

Cities and towns in the Region of Southern Denmark
Populated places in Funen
Kerteminde Municipality